Windsor Memorial is a 25-story apartment building containing 274 units, with a smaller structure containing 60 lofts located on  and located along Memorial Drive in Houston, Texas and managed by Windsor Communities.

See also

List of tallest buildings in Houston
List of tallest buildings in Texas

References

Buildings and structures completed in 2010
Residential skyscrapers in Houston